The 1994–95 Algerian Cup is the 31st edition of the Algerian Cup. JS Kabylie are the defending champions, having beaten AS Aïn M'lila 1–0 in the previous season's final.

Round of 64

Round of 32

Round of 16

Quarter-finals

Semi-finals

Final

Match

References

Algerian Cup
Algerian Cup
Algerian Cup